Adolf Germann (2 February 1857, in Bleiken – 7 May 1924, in Frauenfeld) was a Swiss politician and President of the Swiss National Council (1908/09).

External links 
 
 

Members of the National Council (Switzerland)
Presidents of the National Council (Switzerland)
1857 births
1924 deaths
People from Frauenfeld